Collin Westby (born 19 February 1995) is a Belizean international footballer who plays for Verdes, as a defender.

Career
Westby has also played club football for Placencia Assassins and Altitude.

He made his international debut for Belize in 2018.

References

1995 births
Living people
Belizean footballers
Belize international footballers
Altitude FC (Belize) players
Association football midfielders